Below is the list of populated places in Tunceli Province, Turkey by the districts. In the following lists first place in each list is the administrative center of the district.

Tunceli
	Tunceli
	Aktuluk, Tunceli
	Alacık, Tunceli
	Altınyüzük, Tunceli
	Anbar, Tunceli
	Atadoğdu, Tunceli
	Atlantı, Tunceli
	Babaocağı, Tunceli
	Baldan, Tunceli
	Başakçı, Tunceli
	Batman, Tunceli
	Baylık, Tunceli
	Böğürtlen, Tunceli
	Buğulu, Tunceli
	Burmageçit, Tunceli
	Cılga, Tunceli
	Çalkıran, Tunceli
	Çemçeli, Tunceli
	Çıralı, Tunceli
	Çimenli, Tunceli
	Çukur, Tunceli
	Dedeağaç, Tunceli
	Demirkapı, Tunceli
	Dilek, Tunceli
	Doludizgin, Tunceli
	Doluküp, Tunceli
	Düzpelit, Tunceli
	Eğriyamaç, Tunceli
	Erdoğdu, Tunceli
	Geyiksuyu, Tunceli
	Gökçek, Tunceli
	Gömemiş, Tunceli
	Gözen, Tunceli
	Güdeç, Tunceli
	Güleç, Tunceli
	Gürbüzler, Tunceli
	Kanoğlu, Tunceli
	Karşılar, Tunceli
	Kocakoç, Tunceli
	Kocalar, Tunceli
	Kopuzlar, Tunceli
	Kuyluca, Tunceli
	Meşeyolu, Tunceli
	Okurlar, Tunceli
	Pınar, Tunceli
	Sarıtaş, Tunceli
	Sinan, Tunceli
	Suvat, Tunceli
	Taht, Tunceli
	Tüllük, Tunceli
	Uzuntarla, Tunceli
	Yeşilkaya, Tunceli
	Yolkonak, Tunceli

Çemişgezek
	Çemişgezek
	Akçapınar, Çemişgezek
	Akçayunt, Çemişgezek
	Alakuş, Çemişgezek
	Anıl, Çemişgezek
	Arpaderen, Çemişgezek
	Aşağıbudak, Çemişgezek
	Aşağıdemirbük, Çemişgezek
	Bağsuyu, Çemişgezek
	Bozağaç, Çemişgezek
	Büyükörence, Çemişgezek
	Cebe, Çemişgezek
	Doğan, Çemişgezek
	Doğanalan, Çemişgezek
	Erkalkan, Çemişgezek
	Gedikler, Çemişgezek
	Gözlüçayır, Çemişgezek
	Gülbahçe, Çemişgezek
	Karasar, Çemişgezek
	Kıraçlar, Çemişgezek
	Paşacık, Çemişgezek
	Payamdüzü, Çemişgezek
	Sakyol, Çemişgezek
	Sarıbalta, Çemişgezek
	Tekeli, Çemişgezek
	Toratlı, Çemişgezek
	Ulaklı, Çemişgezek
	Ulukale, Çemişgezek
	Uzungöl, Çemişgezek
	Vişneli, Çemişgezek
	Yemişdere, Çemişgezek
	Yukarıbudak, Çemişgezek
	Yünbüken, Çemişgezek

Hozat
	Hozat
	Akpınar, Hozat
	Alancık, Hozat
	Altınçevre, Hozat
	Balkaynar, Hozat
	Beşelma, Hozat
	Boydaş, Hozat
	Buzlupınar, Hozat
	Çağlarca, Hozat
	Çaytaşı, Hozat
	Çığırlı, Hozat
	Dalören, Hozat
	Dervişcemal, Hozat
	Geçimli, Hozat
	İn, Hozat
	Kalecik, Hozat
	Karabakır, Hozat
	Karaca, Hozat
	Karaçavuş, Hozat
	Kardelen, Hozat
	Kavuktepe, Hozat
	Sarısaltık, Hozat
	Taşıtlı, Hozat
	Türktaner, Hozat
	Uzundal, Hozat
	Yenidoğdu, Hozat
	Yüceldi, Hozat

Mazgirt
	Mazgirt		
	Ağaçardı, Mazgirt		
	Akdüven, Mazgirt		
	Akkavak, Mazgirt		
	Akpazar, Mazgirt		
	Aktarla, Mazgirt		
	Akyünlü, Mazgirt		
	Alanyazı, Mazgirt		
	Alhan, Mazgirt		
	Anıtçınar, Mazgirt		
	Aslanyurdu, Mazgirt		
	Aşağıoyumca, Mazgirt		
	Aşağıtarlacık, Mazgirt		
	Ataçınar, Mazgirt		
	Avunca, Mazgirt		
	Aydınlık, Mazgirt		
	Ayvatlı, Mazgirt		
	Balkan, Mazgirt		
	Beşoluk, Mazgirt		
	Beylermezrası, Mazgirt		
	Bulgurcular, Mazgirt		
	Çatköy, Mazgirt		
	Dallıbel, Mazgirt		
	Danaburan, Mazgirt		
	Darıkent, Mazgirt		
	Dayılar, Mazgirt		
	Dazkaya, Mazgirt		
	Demirci, Mazgirt		
	Demirkazık, Mazgirt		
	Doğanlı, Mazgirt		
	Doğucak, Mazgirt		
	Geçitveren, Mazgirt		
	Gelincik, Mazgirt		
	Gelinpınar, Mazgirt		
	Göktepe, Mazgirt		
	Güleç, Mazgirt		
	Gümüşgün, Mazgirt		
	İbimahmut, Mazgirt		
	İsmailli, Mazgirt		
	Kalaycı, Mazgirt		
	Kale, Mazgirt		
	Karayusuf, Mazgirt		
	Karsan, Mazgirt		
	Karşıkonak, Mazgirt		
	Kartutan, Mazgirt		
	Kavaktepe, Mazgirt		
	Kayacı, Mazgirt		
	Kepektaşı, Mazgirt		
	Kızılcık, Mazgirt		
	Kızılkale, Mazgirt		
	Koçkuyusu, Mazgirt		
	Koyunuşağı, Mazgirt		
	Köklüce, Mazgirt		
	Kuşaklı, Mazgirt		
	Kuşhane, Mazgirt		
	Obrukkaşı, Mazgirt		
	Obuzbaşı, Mazgirt		
	Ortadurak, Mazgirt		
	Ortaharman, Mazgirt		
	Otlukaya, Mazgirt		
	Oymadal, Mazgirt		
	Öreniçi, Mazgirt		
	Özdek, Mazgirt		
	Sarıkoç, Mazgirt		
	Sökücek, Mazgirt		
	Sülüntaş, Mazgirt		
	Temürtaht, Mazgirt		
	Yaşaroğlu, Mazgirt		
	Yazeli, Mazgirt		
	Yeldeğen, Mazgirt		
	Yenibudak, Mazgirt		
	Yukarıoyumca, Mazgirt

Nazımiye
	Nazımiye
	Aşağıdoluca, Nazımiye
	Ayranlı, Nazımiye
	Ballıca, Nazımiye
	Beytaşı, Nazımiye
	Bostanlı, Nazımiye
	Büyükyurt, Nazımiye
	Çevrecik, Nazımiye
	Dallıbahçe, Nazımiye
	Demirce, Nazımiye
	Dereova, Nazımiye
	Doğantaş, Nazımiye
	Geriş, Nazımiye
	Güneycik, Nazımiye
	Günlüce, Nazımiye
	Güzelpınar, Nazımiye
	Kapıbaşı, Nazımiye
	Kılköy, Nazımiye
	Ramazan, Nazımiye
	Sapköy, Nazımiye
	Sarıyayla, Nazımiye
	Turnayolu, Nazımiye
	Yayıkağıl, Nazımiye
	Yazgeldi, Nazımiye
	Yiğitler, Nazımiye
	Yukarıdoluca, Nazımiye

Ovacık
	Ovacık
	Ada, Ovacık
	Akyayık, Ovacık
	Arslandoğmuş, Ovacık
	Aşağıtorunoba, Ovacık
	Aşlıca, Ovacık
	Bilgeç, Ovacık
	Burnak, Ovacık
	Buzlutepe, Ovacık
	Büyükköy, Ovacık
	Cevizlidere, Ovacık
	Çakmaklı, Ovacık
	Çambulak, Ovacık
	Çemberlitaş, Ovacık
	Çöğürlük, Ovacık
	Eğrikavak, Ovacık
	Eğripınar, Ovacık
	Eskigedik, Ovacık
	Gözeler, Ovacık
	Güneykonak, Ovacık
	Hanuşağı, Ovacık
	Havuzlu, Ovacık
	Isıtma, Ovacık
	Işıkvuran, Ovacık
	Karayonca, Ovacık
	Kızık, Ovacık
	Konaklar, Ovacık
	Koyungölü, Ovacık
	Kozluca, Ovacık
	Köseler, Ovacık
	Kuşluca, Ovacık
	Mollaaliler, Ovacık
	Öveçler, Ovacık
	Paşadüzü, Ovacık
	Sarıtosun, Ovacık
	Söğütlü, Ovacık
	Tatuşağı, Ovacık
	Topuzlu, Ovacık
	Yarımkaya, Ovacık
	Yaylagünü, Ovacık
	Yazıören, Ovacık
	Yenikonak, Ovacık
	Yenisöğüt, Ovacık
	Yeşilyazı, Ovacık
	Yoncalı, Ovacık
	Ziyaret, Ovacık

Pertek
	Pertek		
	Akdemir, Pertek		
	Ardıç, Pertek		
	Arpalı, Pertek		
	Aşağıgülbahçe, Pertek		
	Ayazpınar, Pertek		
	Bakırlı, Pertek		
	Ballıdut, Pertek		
	Beydamı, Pertek		
	Biçmekaya, Pertek		
	Bulgurtepe, Pertek		
	Çakırbahçe, Pertek		
	Çalıözü, Pertek		
	Çataksu, Pertek		
	Çukurca, Pertek		
	Demirsaban, Pertek		
	Dere, Pertek		
	Dereli, Pertek		
	Dorutay, Pertek		
	Elmakaşı, Pertek		
	Geçityaka, Pertek		
	Gövdeli, Pertek		
	Günboğazı, Pertek		
	Kaçarlar, Pertek		
	Karagüney, Pertek		
	Kayabağ, Pertek		
	Kazılı, Pertek		
	Koçpınar, Pertek		
	Kolankaya, Pertek		
	Konaklar, Pertek		
	Konurat, Pertek		
	Korluca, Pertek		
	Mercimek, Pertek		
	Pınarlar, Pertek		
	Pirinççi, Pertek		
	Sağman, Pertek		
	Söğütlütepe, Pertek		
	Sumak, Pertek		
	Sürgüç, Pertek		
	Tozkoparan, Pertek		
	Ulupınar, Pertek		
	Yalınkaya, Pertek		
	Yamaçoba, Pertek		
	Yeniköy, Pertek		
	Yukarıgülbahçe, Pertek		
	Yukarıyakabaşı, Pertek

Pülümür
	Pülümür
	Ağaşenlik, Pülümür
	Akdik, Pülümür
	Altunhüseyin, Pülümür
	Ardıçlı, Pülümür
	Bardakçı, Pülümür
	Başkalecik, Pülümür
	Boğalı, Pülümür
	Bozağakaraderbent, Pülümür
	Çağlayan, Pülümür
	Çakırkaya, Pülümür
	Çobanyıldızı, Pülümür
	Dağbek, Pülümür
	Dağyolu, Pülümür
	Dereboyu, Pülümür
	Dereköy, Pülümür
	Derindere, Pülümür
	Doğanpınar, Pülümür
	Efeağılı, Pülümür
	Elmalı, Pülümür
	Göcenek, Pülümür
	Gökçekonak, Pülümür
	Hacılı, Pülümür
	Hasangazi, Pülümür
	Kabadal, Pülümür
	Kangallı, Pülümür
	Karagöz, Pülümür
	Kayırlar, Pülümür
	Kaymaztepe, Pülümür
	Kırdım, Pülümür
	Kırklar, Pülümür
	Kırkmeşe, Pülümür
	Kocatepe, Pülümür
	Kovuklu, Pülümür
	Közlüce, Pülümür
	Kuzulca, Pülümür
	Mezra, Pülümür
	Nohutlu, Pülümür
	Sağlamtaş, Pülümür
	Salkımözü, Pülümür
	Sarıgül, Pülümür
	Senek, Pülümür
	Süleymanuşağı, Pülümür
	Şampaşakaraderbent, Pülümür
	Taşlık, Pülümür
	Turnadere, Pülümür
	Üçdam, Pülümür
	Ünveren, Pülümür
	Yarbaşı, Pülümür

References

Tunceli
List